Asca ornatissima is a species of mite in the family Ascidae.

References

Further reading

 

ornatissima
Articles created by Qbugbot
Animals described in 1969